Charles Henry Daub (September 12, 1855 – April 3, 1917) was a member of the Wisconsin State Assembly.

Biography
Daub was born on September 12, 1855 in Siegen, then in Prussia. He moved with his parents to Lewiston, Minnesota in 1868 and to Eau Claire, Wisconsin in 1869. There he made a living as, among other things, a strawberry farmer. He married Emily Chase and they had four children. He died on April 3, 1917.

Assembly career
Daub defeated Elmer E. Tobey in the 1908 election to serve as a member of the Assembly during the 1909 session. He was a Republican.

References

External links

People from Siegen
People from Winona County, Minnesota
Politicians from Eau Claire, Wisconsin
Republican Party members of the Wisconsin State Assembly
Farmers from Wisconsin
1855 births
1917 deaths
19th-century American politicians